Joseph Anthony Pisarcik (born July 2, 1952) is a former American football quarterback who played in the National Football League (NFL) for eight seasons, from 1977 through 1984 after playing high school football at West Side Central Catholic H. S. (later Bishop O'Reilly, now closed), and college football at New Mexico State University. His first professional team was the Calgary Stampeders of the Canadian Football League, where he played from 1974 to 1976.

He began his NFL career with the New York Giants and is best remembered for his role in the November 19, 1978, game where the Giants, ahead 17–12 with only seconds to play and their opponent out of time-outs, lost after his handoff (a play called by offensive coordinator Bob Gibson over Pisarcik's objections) to Larry Csonka was fumbled and returned for a touchdown by Herman Edwards of the Philadelphia Eagles. The play has since been referred to as "The Fumble" by Giants fans and "The Miracle at the Meadowlands" by Eagles fans, and it was instrumental in making the Quarterback kneel (also known as "taking a knee") a routine play for running down the clock at the end of a game.

Pisarcik was traded to the Eagles in 1980 for a sixth round pick, primarily serving as the backup to QB Ron Jaworski. He stayed with the Eagles until retiring after the 1984 season.

A resident of Mount Laurel, New Jersey, Pisarcik has five children:  Kristin, Lindsey, Jake, Joseph and Katie. Jake is an offensive lineman for the University of Oregon.

Pisarcik served as the CEO of the NFL Alumni Association in Newark. He retired in April 2017. Pisarcik was later sued by three women who alleged sexual harassment.

See also
History of the New York Giants (1925-1978)

References

 December 21, 2001; Go, Joe, Go!, Philadelphia Business Journal.

1952 births
Living people
People from Kingston, Pennsylvania
Players of American football from Pennsylvania
American football quarterbacks
New Mexico State Aggies football players
New York Giants players
Philadelphia Eagles players
Calgary Stampeders players
Canadian football quarterbacks
American players of Canadian football
American people of Polish descent
People from Mount Laurel, New Jersey
Sportspeople from Burlington County, New Jersey